Tariq AlKazim  is an Emirati filmmaker. He had won the Arabian Business Future Star award in 2018. He is best known for his 2017 movie A Tale of Shadows and the short film, "The Man Who Met The Angel", which premiered in the Dubai International Film Festival, Also "Death Circle" and "Quiet" Which both premiered in the gulf film festival.

Filmography

Awards 
In 2018 he was awarded the Arabian Business Future Star.

References 

 http://gulfnews.com/leisure/movies/features/emirati-horror-film-comes-out-of-the-shadows-1.2076911
 https://www.thenational.ae/arts-culture/film/new-emirati-horror-a-tale-of-shadows-lights-up-the-big-screen-1.619995
 http://english.alarabiya.net/en/life-style/entertainment/2017/08/17/Emirati-film-enters-the-Horror-movie-genre.html

External links 
 
 
 
 

1992 births
Living people